The 2010 Dallas Vigilantes season was the inaugural season for the franchise in the Arena Football League (AFL). With many players of the old Desperados team that put up a 15–1 record in recent years returning, Dallas fans had high hopes for the Vigilantes carrying on with the Desperados' success. However, after a 1–5 start and an altercation with one of his players, head coach Rich Ingold was fired, and replaced by James Fuller for the remainder of the season. Eventually Clint Dolezel was named as head coach for the 2011 season after the Vigilantes went 2–8 in their final ten games to finish the 2010 season 3–13, despite winning their last game of the season on the road, 62–56 against the Bossier–Shreveport Battle Wings. Two of Dallas's three wins that season came on the road.

In the long run, the Vigilantes finished second-to-last in points per game with 50, only more than the Utah Blaze, who averaged 46.4 points a game. Dallas also shot themselves in the foot with 150 penalties, fifth most in the league behind the Milwaukee Iron, (193) Tampa Bay Storm, (186)Oklahoma City Yard Dawgz, (168) and  Orlando Predators. (164) The defense gave up the third most in the league at 57.5 points a game, better than only Bossier-Shreveport and Utah.

The team was coached by Rich Ingold for the first six games before being fired on May 24. Defensive coordinator James Fuller was promoted to interim head coach. The Vigilantes will play their home games at American Airlines Center. The Vigilantes missed the playoffs after finishing with a 3–13 record and placing 7th in the American Conference.

Standings

Regular season schedule
The first game in franchise history for the Vigilantes was on April 10 during Week 2, on the road against the Talons. Their first home game will not be until Week 5 against the Yard Dawgz. The last game of the regular season saw the team visit the Battle Wings on July 31.

All times are EDT

Roster

Regular season

Week 1: BYE

Week 2: at Tulsa Talons

After a 20-yard touchdown reception by Derek Lee, the Vigilantes had an 11-point lead with 6:33 left in the 4th quarter. However, the Talons fought back with a pair of short touchdown runs by their quarterback, Justin Allgood, the second of which set up by a fumble recovery by Tulsa's Jamar Ransom at the Dallas 2-yard line. The Vigilantes' final drive fell short of a touchdown, resulting in a loss. Quarterback Shane Stafford threw for 347 yards and 5 touchdowns, while Josh White ran for 33 yards and 3 touchdowns in the losing effort.

Week 3: at Tampa Bay Storm

Dallas got off to a quick start by returning the opening kickoff for a touchdown. Having lost starting quarterback Shane Stafford to injury, Collin Drafts was called on to take his place. Drafts completed 21 of 30 passes for 212 yards, and had 5 total touchdowns on the day, but a key play with under a minute left in the 1st half shifted the momentum in the game to Tampa Bay. It was 4th and goal on the 1-yard line for the Vigilantes, but they were unable to take the ball in for a score, turning the ball over on downs. Now with possession, the Storm took the ball the length of the field for a touchdown. Instead of increasing their lead before the half, the Vigilantes now trailed. Drafts had a 15-yard rushing touchdown midway through the 3rd quarter to regain the lead, but the Dallas defense allowed Tampa Bay to take it right back, and Dallas never led the rest of the night. The loss dropped the Vigilantes to 0–2.

Week 4: BYE

Week 5: vs. Oklahoma City Yard Dawgz

The Vigilantes won their first game in franchise history by defeating the Yard Dawgz 55–34. Dallas had a 20–0 lead after the 1st quarter. Oklahoma City scored the first three touchdowns on the 2nd quarter to take a 21–20 lead, but Dallas came up with three touchdowns of their own in the final minute of the half on a pair of passing touchdowns and an interception that was returned for a touchdown. The rest of the game did not see much scoring by either team, allowing Dallas to cruise to a victory.

Collin Drafts threw for 239 yards and 4 touchdowns, and also had a rushing touchdown. Larry Brackins was the leading receiver with 111 yards on 7 catches and 2 touchdowns.

Week 6: vs. Orlando Predators

After taking a 63–44 lead after 3 quarters, the Orlando Predators took advantage of turnovers on Dallas, which cost Dallas the game. Collin Drafts threw 6 touchdowns but had 3 interceptions, all in the 4th quarter. Drafts also fumbled a snap late in the game, which was picked up by Orlando at the Dallas 8-yard line and taken in for a touchdown.

Week 7: at Jacksonville Sharks

The Vigilantes fell behind 36–7 late in the 1st half. Scoring the game's next 3 touchdowns, they made it an 8-point game, and by the end of the 3rd quarter trailed 43–35. After the teams traded the first two touchdowns of the 4th quarter, Jacksonville took a 14-point lead on a fumble by Collin Drafts a yard out of his own end zone that was picked up by the Sharks and taken in for the score. Dallas ran out of time for a comeback, falling 70–49.

Drafts threw for 308 yards and 7 touchdowns with an interception. In all, Dallas had 4 turnovers in the game. Larry Brackins caught 12 passes, 5 for touchdowns, with 119 total receiving yards.

Week 8: vs. Chicago Rush

Following another loss, head coach Rich Ingold was fired. Defensive coordinator James Fuller was promoted to interim head coach.

Week 9: at Milwaukee Iron

Week 10: vs. Bossier–Shreveport Battle Wings

Week 11: vs. Tulsa Talons

Week 12: at Alabama Vipers

Week 13: at Oklahoma City Yard Dawgz

Week 14: vs. Iowa Barnstormers

Week 15: vs. Tampa Bay Storm

Week 16: at Chicago Rush

Week 17: vs. Utah Blaze

Week 18: at Bossier–Shreveport Battle Wings

References

Dallas Vigilantes
Dallas Vigilantes seasons